The Kawasaki Ki-64 (Allied code name: Rob) was a one-off prototype of an experimental heavy, single seat, fighter. It had two unusual design features. First; it had two Kawasaki Ha-40 engines in tandem; one in the aircraft nose, the other behind the cockpit, both being connected by a drive shaft. This combination (called the Kawasaki Ha-201) drove two, three-bladed, contra-rotating propellers. The second feature was the use of the wing surface as a radiator for the water-cooled engines. The aircraft first flew in December 1943. During the fifth flight, the rear engine caught fire; and while the aircraft made an emergency landing, it was damaged. The aircraft was subsequently abandoned in mid-1944 in favour of more promising projects. The airframe survived the war, and parts of the unique cooling system were sent to Wright Field for examination.

Specifications (Ki-64)

See also

References

Citations

Bibliography

  (new edition 1987 by Putnam Aeronautical Books, .)
 
 
 Unknown Author(s). Famous Aircraft of the World, no.76: Japanese Army Experimental Fighters (1). Tokyo, Japan: Bunrin-Do Co. Ltd., August 1976.

External links

 Article about the Kawasaki fighters on www.vectorsite.net (accessed 21-04-2010)
 Article about the Ki-64 on www.warbirdsresourcegroup.org (accessed 21-04-2010)

Ki-064
Ki-064, Kawasaki
Twin-engined single-prop tractor aircraft
Aircraft with contra-rotating propellers
Low-wing aircraft
Abandoned military aircraft projects of Japan
Ki-064, Kawasaki
Aircraft first flown in 1943